Pensacola Private School Of Liberal Arts (SOLA) is a private secondary school in Pensacola, Florida, established in 1969 by William J. Holston to be an alternative to area public schools. Holston, along with previous alumni, operate in the School as both office staff and as teachers, assisting students in grades 7th-12th, of various ethnic and financial backgrounds. SOLA was initially located in Pensacola's Sacred Heart Hospital on 12th Avenue. In the early 1980s Holston moved SOLA to his once private residence located on 13th Avenue. SOLA remained at that location until 2013, when the school downsized and returned to Sacred Heart Hospital.

Holston was the band director at Pensacola High School and principal of Woodham High School for the 1968-1969 School Year before establishing SOLA. He left Woodham High and the public school district for various reasons, the chief being the commotion sparked by the rezoning of schools.

Today, SOLA is headed by Jacqueline Tarver, an alumna herself. She attended PSC and UWF earning her bachelor's degree in Public Health & Studio Art. She is currently attending UWF to attain a master's degree in Curriculum & Instruction in Secondary Education. Tarver worked directly under Holston for six years until his passing in 2011. The 2013-2014 School Year completed Mrs. Tarver's ninth year at SOLA.

External links
 Official website

Pensacola metropolitan area
Buildings and structures in Pensacola, Florida
High schools in Escambia County, Florida
Private high schools in Florida
1969 establishments in Florida
Educational institutions established in 1969